Mansuri Rural District is a rural district (dehestan) in Homeyl District, Eslamabad-e Gharb County, Kermanshah Province, Iran. At the 2006 census, its population was 4,685, in 1,046 families. The rural district has 24 villages.

References 

Rural Districts of Kermanshah Province
Eslamabad-e Gharb County